Njanum Ente Familiyum (English: Me and my family)) is a 2012 Malayalam family drama film directed by K. K. Rajeev and starring Jayaram and Mamta Mohandas in the lead roles. Written by Cheriyan Kalpakavadi, it is the first feature film by television serial director K. K. Rajeev. The film examines the problems in a doctor family and is told in a humorous way. The film was shot from the locales of Palakkad and Munnar in Kerala and Pollachi in Tamil Nadu.

Plot
The film starts with Dr. Dinanathan and his family leaving for a vacation. But midway they get a call from the hospital due to an emergency surgery and he has to come back to the hospital for the surgery. Later, all goes well and the Dinanathan is called to Chennai for a surgery and it turns out to be his ex-lover Sophia's husband who dies in spite of the successful surgery and he sends a letter to Dinanathan telling him to take care of Sophia. From there the story continues in very complicated situations which resultes in the birth of Dinanathan's child from Sophia & death of Sophia due to a careless mistake and Dinanathan taking the baby into his own family.

Cast
 Jayaram as Dr. Dinanathan
 Mamta Mohandas as Dr. Priya
 Mythili as Sophia
 Manoj K. Jayan as John Paileykunnel
 Jagathy Sreekumar as Dr. Easwarmoorthy
 Mallika Sukumaran as Jaininte
 Nedumudi Venu
 Baby Esther Anil as Dinanathan's daughter

References

External links

2010s Malayalam-language films
2012 directorial debut films
2012 films
Films shot in Munnar
Films shot in Palakkad
Films shot in Pollachi
2012 drama films